John Leslie Barford (1886–1937) was an English Uranian poet who wrote under the pseudonym of Philebus. According to Timothy D'Arch Smith, he was a doctor in the Merchant Navy. His works, which were privately printed, include Ladslove Lyrics (1918), Young Things (1921), Fantasies (1923) and Whimsies (1934).

References
 Smith, Timothy D'Arch. Love in Earnest: Some Notes on the Lives and Writings of English "Uranian" Poets from 1889 to 1930. Routledge & Kegan Paul, 1970.

Notes

British gay writers
1886 births
1937 deaths
English LGBT poets
English male poets
20th-century English male writers